The Men's Handball Tournament at the 1999 Pan American Games was held from July 31 to August 7, 1999 in Winnipeg, Manitoba, Canada. The women competed from July 31 to August 8.

Men's tournament

Final ranking

Awards

Women's tournament

Final ranking

Awards

Medal table

References

 Results
 sports123

P
1999
Events at the 1999 Pan American Games
International handball competitions hosted by Canada